Tamilnad Mercantile Bank Limited (TMB) is a bank headquartered at Thoothukudi, Tamil Nadu, India. TMB was founded in 1921 as the Nadar Bank, but changed its name to Tamilnad Mercantile Bank in November 1962 to widen its appeal beyond the Nadar community. For the financial year 2018–2019, the bank reported a net profit of  2585 million. The bank currently has 509 full branches throughout India, 12 Regional offices and two link offices, two central processing centres, one Service Branch, four Currency Chests, 48 eLobby centres, 262 Cash Recycler Machines (Cash deposit machine) and 1151 Automated Teller Machines (ATM). The bank has been expanding its footprint all over India.

TMB was rated as the fastest growing Private Sector Bank continuously for the five years from 2010 to 2015. It was also rated as the Best Bank in the years 2013, 2014 and 2015, due to its robust growth. During the years of 2018 and 2019 it did total business of 616 billion rupees. The bank's planned outlay for the financial year is to reach business worth 600 billion rupees, add an additional 24 branches, and increase its ATMs to 1151. The bank has won the Lokmat BFSI Best Private Sector Bank 2014-15 award.

History

The history of Tamilnad Mercantile Bank dates back to 1921. The idea to establish a bank for the Nadar business community was first proposed at the annual meeting of the Nadar Mahajana Sangam held at Thoothukudi in 1920.

The bank was originally registered on 11 May 1921, as Nadar Bank Limited, under the Indian Companies Act, 1913. M. V. Shanmugavel Nadar was elected as the first chairman on 4 November 1921. The bank was opened to the public by T. V. Balagurusamy Nadar on 11 November 1921 in Ana Mavanna Building at South Raja Street, Thoothukudi.

In 1937, Nadar Bank opened a branch in Sri Lanka, but by 1939 it had closed it.

By 1947, the bank had only four branches: Thoothukudi, Madurai, Sivakasi and Virudhunagar. The bank opened its first Indian branch outside the state of Tamil Nadu in 1976 at Bengaluru.

The first fully computerised branch was opened at WGC Road, Thoothukudi on 9 December 1984. The Bank launched its ATM Card on 11 November 2003.

On 6 September 2021, the Tamilnad Mercantile Bank filed a draft red herring prospectus with the Securities and Exchange Board of India to raise funds through an initial public offering. On 7 June 2022, the company received approval from the Securities and Exchange Board of India for its Initial public offering.

Technology Initiatives
Tamilnad Mercantile Bank was the first private sector bank in India to introduce computerisation for branch-level operations. The bank adopted modernization as early in the year 1983. Today all 509 branches of the bank are networked using Infosys's  "FINACLE" Software and have achieved 100% connectivity.

RTGS/NEFT facilities in ebanking have been successfully implemented. The bank has also entered into an agreement with BillDesk (India ideas.com), CCAvenue (Avenues India), SBI ePay, Atom Technologies and PayU India for providing payment gateway services to the internet banking customers. It was the first old bank to have introduced mobile banking and providing POS machines to their Customers.

The bank has implemented a video conferencing facility to connect Head Office with various Departments and Regional offices. TMB is a member of National Financial Switch for its ATM operations.

Tie-up arrangement made with Western Union Money Transfer, UAE Exchange & Financial Services...etc. for remittances from abroad to India to facilitate quick receipt of remittances by the beneficiaries. The bank has tie-up agreement with ICICI Prudential Mutual Fund, UTI Mutual Fund, Reliance Mutual Fund, Franklin Templeton Mutual Fund, Birla Sun Life Mutual Fund, Sundaram Mutual Fund and HDFC Mutual Fund for selling their Mutual Fund Products. The bank became a Depository participant through NSDL to make available Demat facilities. TMB was the first bank in south India to offer ASBA facilities. It also offers off-line and online share-trading through Religare Securities. TMB entered the commodity futures market by becoming a clearing bank for NCDEX and MCX. It was one of the first banks in the banking industry to have online deposit opening through the TMB e-connect facility.

TMB has introduced "Choose Your Account Number" facility for anywhere banking account holders and introduced Missed Call Banking to check Account Balance, BSNL bill payment through branches and RuPay Debit Card. The Mobile application like TMB e-Passbook and TMB Locations are also introduced.

Foreign Exchange
The bank achieved a turnover of 15,726 crores in foreign exchange for the year ended March 2019. In terms of forex turnover, TMB ranks first among the Tamil Nadu-based private sector banks. With a view to provide enhanced facilities to the bank's customers, the bank shifted its foreign exchange department from Tuticorin to Chennai, and created an integrated Treasury and Foreign Exchange Operations Department with adequate infrastructure to handle trading in Government Securities, Bonds, Shares, foreign exchange and derivatives. TMB is a member of the Society for Worldwide Interbank Financial Telecommunication (SWIFT).

Branch sharing tie up
TMB has tie-up arrangements with IDBI Bank (136 locations), and HDFC Bank (531 locations).

Controversies
In 2021 the directors of the bank were fined on two occasions. Once for an amount of 11.33 crores and 5.33 crores for another. The fine was for authorising transfer of shares to foreign entities such as RST Limited, Katra Holdings Limited, GHI I Limited, Kamehameha (Mauritius) Limited, FI Investments (Mauritius) Limited, Cuna Group (Mauritius) Limited, and Swiss Re Investors (Mauritius) Limited,  Sub-Continental Equities Ltd, Mauritius, and Robert & Adris James Company Limited, Mauritius not authorised by Reserve Bank of India for acquiring shares in the bank.

See also

 Banking in India
 List of banks in India
 Reserve Bank of India
 Indian Financial System Code
 List of largest banks
 List of companies of India
 Make in India

Citations and references 
Citations

References
de S. Gunasekera, H.A. (1962) From dependent currency to central banking in Ceylon; an analysis of monetary experience, 1825-1957. (London School of Economics and Political Science, University of London).

External links 
 
 The billion-rupee war for the Tamilnad Mercantile Bank
 Tamilnad Mercantile Bank IFSC Codes

Private sector banks in India
Banks established in 1921
Companies based in Tuticorin
Indian companies established in 1921